Punish, Honey is the second studio album by Vessel. It was released on 12 September 2014 by Tri Angle. A departure from the dub sound of his debut album, Order of Noise (2012), it is an industrial, techno and electronica album.

Accolades

Track listing

Personnel
Credits adapted from the liner notes of Punish, Honey.

 Sebastian Gainsborough – production
 Matt Colton – mastering
 Steph Elizabeth Third – photography
 Harry Wright – artwork

References

2014 albums
Tri Angle (record label) albums